Pinole (Spanish for "cornmeal") is a city in Contra Costa County, California, United States. The population was 18,390 at the 2010 census.

History 

The name derives from "pinole", a Nāhuatl word for a kind of flour made from the seeds of maize, chia, and various other grasses and annual herbs. An expedition under Pedro Fages was said to have run out of provisions while exploring the area, and to have been fed pinole by a local village, and so the Spaniards named their camp "El Pinole".

In 1823, Ygnacio Martínez, commandant of the Presidio of San Francisco, received a land grant of Rancho El Pinole from the Mexican government. Martinez built a hacienda in Pinole Valley at the present site of Pinole Valley Park. During the 1850s, Bernardo Fernandez, a Portuguese immigrant, started a trading facility on the shores of San Pablo Bay and eventually built the historic Fernandez Mansion, which still stands today at the end of Tennent Avenue. From these early beginnings, a small but thriving community grew into the city now known as Pinole.

The settlement grew with the coming of the Southern Pacific Railroad in 1878 and the establishment of the California Powder Works in nearby Hercules. During this period, this city had an active waterfront and was a regional commercial and banking center. The first post office also opened in 1878. The City of Pinole was incorporated in 1903.

Pinole and the surrounding area grew rapidly during the post-World War II boom. With the coming of Interstate 80 in 1958, the town evolved into a suburban bedroom community within the San Francisco/Oakland commuter belt. Much of its original industry was displaced during this time, and the town became predominantly residential.

Today, the town is locally known for its "big box" shopping store district along Fitzgerald Drive, and Pinole Vista Shopping Center, which is contiguous with Richmond's Hilltop Area. The downtown area still retains much turn-of-the-century building stock and is being preserved by the city's development agency as a historic area.

Geography

The city of Pinole has habitat areas that support the endangered species Santa Cruz Tarweed on the California coastal prairie ecosystem. A colony of this rare plant was discovered during preparation of an Environmental Impact Report for a proposed shopping center on the east side of I-80 in the late 1980s. Subsequently, a plan was developed by the city to conduct replanting of this tarweed on the slopes within the right-of-way of Interstate Highway 80. Also running through is Pinole Creek.

Demographics

2010

At the 2010 census Pinole had a population of 18,390. The racial makeup of Pinole was 8,488 (46.2%) White, 2,458 (13.4%) African American, 147 (0.8%) Native American, 4,220 (22.9%) Asian, 64 (0.3%) Pacific Islander, 1,741 (9.5%) from other races, and 1,272 (6.9%) from two or more races. Hispanic or Latino of any race were 4,005 persons (21.8%).

The census reported that 18,322 people (99.6% of the population) lived in households, 53 (0.3%) lived in non-institutionalized group quarters, and 15 (0.1%) were institutionalized.

There were 6,775 households, 2,202 (32.5%) had children under the age of 18 living in them, 3,500 (51.7%) were opposite-sex married couples living together, 1,012 (14.9%) had a female householder with no husband present, 363 (5.4%) had a male householder with no wife present. There were 325 (4.8%) unmarried opposite-sex partnerships, and 76 (1.1%) same-sex married couples or partnerships. 1,529 households (22.6%) were one person and 676 (10.0%) had someone living alone who was 65 or older. The average household size was 2.70. There were 4,875 families (72.0% of households); the average family size was 3.19.

The age distribution was 3,764 people (20.5%) under the age of 18, 1,674 people (9.1%) aged 18 to 24, 4,325 people (23.5%) aged 25 to 44, 5,779 people (31.4%) aged 45 to 64, and 2,848 people (15.5%) who were 65 or older. The median age was 42.6 years. For every 100 females, there were 90.6 males. For every 100 females age 18 and over, there were 87.0 males.

There were 7,158 housing units at an average density of ,of which 6,775 were occupied, 4,861 (71.7%) by the owners and 1,914 (28.3%) by renters.  The homeowner vacancy rate was 1.5%; the rental vacancy rate was 8.0%. 13,210 people (71.8% of the population) lived in owner-occupied housing units and 5,112 people (27.8%) lived in rental housing units.

2000

At the 2000 census there were 19,039 people in 6,743 households, including 5,057 families, in the city. The population density was 1,413.7/km (3,662.3/mi²). There were 6,828 housing units at an average density of 507.0/km (1,313.4/mi²).  The racial makeup of the city was 54.39% White, 11.11% Black or African American, 0.57% Native American, 21.71% Asian, 0.37% Pacific Islander, 5.81% from other races, and 6.03% from two or more races. 13.75% of the population were Hispanic or Latino of any race.
Of the 6,743 households 34.8% had children under the age of 18 living with them, 56.6% were married couples living together, 13.5% had a female householder with no husband present, and 25.0% were non-families. 20.2% of households were one person and 7.9% were one person aged 65 or older.  The average household size was 2.79 and the average family size was 3.23.

The age distribution was 25.0% under the age of 18, 7.8% from 18 to 24, 28.3% from 25 to 44, 26.0% from 45 to 64, and 12.9% 65 or older. The median age was 39 years. For every 100 females, there were 92.4 males. For every 100 females age 18 and over, there were 87.6 males.

The median household income was $62,256 and the median family income  was $70,172. Males had a median income of $47,335 versus $38,019 for females. The per capita income for the city was $25,170. About 3.5% of families and 5.0% of the population were below the poverty line, including 5.5% of those under age 18 and 8.0% of those age 65 or over.

Arts and culture
The Pinole Community Players have been performing in Pinole since 1986.

Government

On February 10, 2019, Pinole has 11,347 registered voters. Of those, 6,365 (56.1%) are registered Democrats, 1,525 (13.4%) are registered Republicans, and 2,993 (26.4%) have declined to state a political party.

Notable people
 Bernardo Fernandez was an early leader in the town's cattle industry
 Gary Holt of the thrash metal band Exodus lives in Pinole.
 1992 Heisman Trophy winner Gino Torretta is from Pinole. 
 Ray Kremer (1893–1965), who pitched 10 seasons for the Pittsburgh Pirates, winning 143 games, lived and died in Pinole.

In popular culture
 Much of Philip K. Dick's The Days of Perky Pat is set in an underground bunker located at the site of what was once Pinole, California, ten years after a devastating nuclear war.

See also

 Amtrak California

References

External links
 

 
Cities in Contra Costa County, California
San Pablo Bay
Incorporated cities and towns in California
Populated places established in 1903
1903 establishments in California
Cities in the San Francisco Bay Area
Populated coastal places in California